"Uphill Climb" is a 1987 short story written by Canadian science fiction author Robert J. Sawyer. It is the first print appearance of the Quintaglios, a species of sentient dwarf tyrannosaurs, which would later star in his critically acclaimed Quintaglio Ascension Trilogy. It was later reprinted in Iterations, an anthology of short stories written by Robert J. Sawyer.

References

See also

Robert J. Sawyer
Quintaglio Ascension Trilogy

Quintaglio Ascension Trilogy
Works originally published in Amazing Stories
1987 short stories
Canadian speculative fiction short stories